Lynn Peterson may refer to:
 Lynn Peterson (American politician)
 Lynn Peterson (Canadian politician)